, a subsidiary of , is engaged in money-lending in Japan. The company filed for bankruptcy protection in February 2009.

History
The company was founded in 1978 under the name , and changed to its current name in 2002.
Its main areas of business include loans to businesses and discounting bills. It is also noted for the fact that it has many foreign shareholders.

In June 2007, 46 companies, all named [name of prefecture] Asset Finance Co., Ltd., were established as finance subsidiaries throughout Japan. These subsidiaries take charge of extending loans to customers, all branch offices were closed. Currently, SFCG operates a loan office only in Tokyo and is under the jurisdiction of the Tokyo Metropolitan Government.

Related Companies

Parent Company 
KE Holdings Co., Ltd. - A related company wholly owned by the founder (including indirect ownership of 9.36%). The founder is the representative director and president of both KE Holdings and SFCG. KE Holdings owns 52.92% of SFCG stock.

Major Subsidiaries 
Japan Asset Finance Co., Ltd. – Intermediary holding company for SME loan business
Tokyo Asset Finance Co., Ltd. and 45 other companies (one subsidiary each for 46 prefectures) – Took over the business operations of SFCG
T-ZONE Holdings Inc. – Intermediate holding company for investment business
T-ZONE Strategy Corporation- Sales of personal computer products
Former TZCS, Inc.（formerly T-ZONE Capital）- Merged with SFCG on March 26, 2008
TZCI, Inc.
Justice Servicer Co., Ltd. – Loan collection business (servicer)

External links 
Official site: Japanese, English

References

Much of the information in this article was translated from the equivalent article in the Japanese Wikipedia, as retrieved on November 1, 2006.

Financial services companies based in Tokyo
Companies formerly listed on the Tokyo Stock Exchange